Quatzenheim is a commune in the Bas-Rhin department in Grand Est in north-eastern France.

It grew up along an old Roman road leading from Strasbourg to Saverne.

Population

See also
 Communes of the Bas-Rhin department
 Kochersberg

References

Communes of Bas-Rhin